This is a list of horror films that were released in 2023. They are listed in alphabetical order.

References

External links
 Horror films of 2023 on Internet Movie Database

 
2023
2023-related lists
horror